Andrew Lim Tan is a Chinese Filipino billionaire with business interests in real estate, liquor and fast food. In 2011, Forbes magazine rated him fourth on the list of the "Philippines 40 richest" with an estimated net worth of $2 billion. As of May 2018, Forbes magazine ranks him as the 10th-wealthiest person in the Philippines, with his net worth of US$2.6 billion.

Early life
Originally an immigrant from China and a supporter of the Communist Party, Tan was born in Quanzhou, Fujian province. He spent his childhood at an apartment in Hong Kong which was shared by other families. Later, he moved to Manila where he studied accounting at University of the East.

Companies
Tan runs the Alliance Global Group Inc. (AGI). It is composed of four companies:
Megaworld Corporation – A real estate corporation engaged in developing condominiums. It has subsidiaries called Empire East Land Holdings and Suntrust Properties. It was dubbed by Finance Asia, a business tabloid, as the "best managed company" and the "best in corporate governance" in the Philippines for 2006.
Emperador Distillers, Inc. – Best known for its Emperador Brandy which became the world's best-selling brandy in 2006, and Emperador Light. What made it successful was how it was promoted. Instead of following other liquor advertisements that feature attractive women and other dainty images, the ads of Emperador Brandy emphasize successes in life and moral values.
Golden Arches Development Corporation – Operates McDonald's franchises.

Awards and recognitions 
The government of Quezon City honored Tan as "Businessman of the Year" for 2004.

He is the first to receive the PropertyGuru Asia "Icon Award" for 2018.

Personal life
He is married with four children and lives in Manila, Philippines. His eldest son, Kevin L. Tan, was appointed CEO of Alliance Global Group Inc. in 2018. His other son, Kendrick Tan, is an executive director in Emperador, Inc.

See also 

 Tony Tan Caktiong
 Lucio Tan

References

External links
Megaworld Official Site
Emperador Brandy Official Site
Suntrust Properties Inc. Official Site
Empire East Land Holdings Inc. Official Site

1952 births
Living people
University of the East alumni
Hokkien people
Chinese emigrants to the Philippines
Filipino billionaires
Filipino businesspeople in real estate
Drink distillers
Filipino company founders
Filipino people of Chinese descent